Franz Yulievich Levinson-Lessing, or Theodor Levinson-Lessing (March 9, 1861 – October 25, 1939 in St. Petersburg) was a Russian geologist.

He graduated from the physico-mathematical faculty of the University of St. Petersburg in 1883, was placed in charge of the geological collection in 1886, and was appointed privat-docent at St. Petersburg University in 1889. In 1892 he became professor, and the next year dean, of the physico-mathematical faculty of Yuryev University (today University of Tartu). Aside from his work on petrography he published also essays in other branches of geology, the result of scientific journeys throughout Russia.

An island in the Kara Sea was named after this prominent Russian geologist.

Works

In various periodicals more than thirty papers have been published by him, the most important being the following:

 "Olonetzkaya Diabazovaya Formatziya" (in "Trudy St. Peterburgskavo Obschestva Yestestvovyedeniya," xix.);
 "O Fosforitnom Chernozyome" (in "Trudy Volnoekonomicheskavo Obschestva," 1890);
 "O Nyekotorykh Khimicheskikh Tipakh Izvyerzhonykh Porod" (in "Vyestnik Yestestvoznaniya," 1890);
 "Geologicheskiya Izslyedovaniya v Guberlinskhikh Gorakh" (in "Zapiski Mineralnavo Obschestva");
 "Die Variolite von Yalguba" ("Tscherm. Mineral. Mitt." vi.);
 "Die Mikroskopische Beschaffenheit des Jordanalit" (ib. ix.);
 "Etudes sur le Porphirite de Deweboyu" (in "Bulletin de Société Belge de Géologie");
 "1 et 2 Notes sur la structure des roches éruptives" (ib.);
 "Note sur les taxites et les roches élastiques volcaniques" (ib.);
 "Les Ammonée de la Zone à Sporadoceras Munsteri" (ib.);
 "Petrographisches Lexicon" (2 parts, 1893–95);
 "Tablitzy dlya Mikroskopicheskikh Opredeleni Porodoobraznykh Mineralov."
 The last was published in English by Gregory.

Bibliography 
 Entsiklopedicheski Slovar'''

By: Herman Rosenthal, J. G. Lipman

References

 External links 
 
  Левинсон-Лессинг Франц Юльевич at www.rulex.ru''
 Grave of Feodor Yulievich Levinson-Lessing

Russian geologists
Corresponding members of the Saint Petersburg Academy of Sciences
Full Members of the Russian Academy of Sciences (1917–1925)
Full Members of the USSR Academy of Sciences
1861 births
1939 deaths